Edgerton is an unincorporated community located in Brunswick County, in the U.S. state of Virginia.

References

External links
 Edgerton United Methodist Church Cemetery website with list of people buried there

Unincorporated communities in Virginia
Unincorporated communities in Brunswick County, Virginia